The Stansted Express is a direct train service linking London Liverpool Street to London Stansted Airport. It is a sub-brand of Greater Anglia, the current franchise operator of the East Anglia franchise.

History

In 1986, British Rail (BR) extended the electrification of the West Anglia Main Line from Bishop's Stortford to Cambridge. Included in this plan was the construction of a new branch line—diverging from a triangular junction at Stansted Mountfitchet—to serve , at which a new terminal was to open in 1991 providing for a large expansion in scheduled aviation passenger services. Therefore, BR decided to build a dedicated fleet of units to work the new Stansted Express service, designated as Class 322, with the service operated by the Network SouthEast sector.

Upon the privatisation of British Rail in 1996, the Stansted Express was part of West Anglia Great Northern franchise until the tender was reorganised in 2004, at which time it became part of the Greater Anglia franchise operated by one Railway (later renamed National Express East Anglia) until February 2012, when the franchise was taken over by the current operator Abellio Greater Anglia.

Operations
Unlike the Heathrow Express and the Gatwick Express (but like other services between London and Heathrow or Gatwick) the trains also stop at an intermediate station between London and the airport. The Stansted Express stops at Tottenham Hale (which provides interchange with the London Underground Victoria Line). The service takes between 47 and 56 minutes to London Liverpool Street, with trains departing every 30 minutes.
Stansted Express offers several ticket types. In addition to the Single and Return tickets, percentage discounts are available for advance bookings, those travelling in pairs with WebDuo and groups with GroupSave. Every Stansted Express ticket comes with money-saving "2FOR1" (two-for-one) offers on some of London's favourite restaurants, shows and attractions like The London Eye, Madame Tussauds, the Sea Life Centre and Thorpe Park resort. Oyster or Contactless payment cards are not valid on Stansted Express services to/from Stansted Airport, but can be used between Liverpool Street and Tottenham Hale.

Criticism
In May 2009, the former operator of the Stansted Express service, National Express abolished off-peak fares on services from Stansted Airport. Therefore, all fares are considered peak (regardless of day or time travelled) and this is reflected in the price. People who live locally can obtain a discounted ticket by producing ID, though the discounted fare is higher than the previous off-peak fare. In September 2010, advertisements for the Stansted Express at Stansted Airport were banned because they were deemed misleading, advertising a 35-minute journey time to London. The Advertising Standards Authority believed the advertisements might confuse travellers into thinking that the train would reach central London in 35 minutes. Previous operator of the service, National Express defended the adverts, stating that Tottenham Hale allows access to the Victoria Line and also stating that the adverts made no reference to the trains going into central London in 35 minutes.

Rolling stock

Current fleet
As part of the 1,300 new carriages to expand the UK's passenger rail fleet, Stansted Express was designated to receive 120 new vehicles. In February 2009, it was announced that Bombardier Transportation would produce the new trains. Bombardier announced on 2 April that a contract had been signed for the delivery of the 120 coaches between December 2010 and March 2011. The first of the new Class 379 units entered passenger service on 3 March 2011. The Class 379s were replaced by Class 745/1s, the first of which entered service on 28 July 2020.

Past fleet
Stansted Express originally used a fleet of five Class 322 EMUs until it was decided to change to a dedicated fleet of nine Class 317/7 EMUs in 2000, further supplemented by twelve Class 317/8s in 2006. The displaced Class 322s were redeployed on several other routes/franchises around the country before settling into their former role in Scotland, working services between Glasgow/Edinburgh and North Berwick; they stayed there for some time before transferring to Northern Rail, working out of Leeds. They eventually returned into workings out of London Liverpool Street on the GEML, as Greater Anglia needed replacements for the Class 360s sent to EMR. They are planned to be put out of service by the end of 2022. Following the arrival of the new Class 379 units on Stansted Express services, the Class 317/8s were used alongside Class 317/5 and 317/6 units as a common pool. However, since Abellio took over the East Anglia franchise on 5 February 2012, all but one of the Class 317/7s have been scrapped.

See also
 Heathrow Express
 Gatwick Express

References

External links

 
 

Post-privatisation British railway companies
Express
Airport rail links in the United Kingdom
Airport rail links in London
Railway operators in London